Western Approaches is an album by Steve Knightley, Seth Lakeman, and Jenna Witts. Jane Brace of Living Tradition was positive towards the album, noting it "grows on you, with its many musical twists and turns."

Track listing
"Jigsaw" (Witts/Lakeman) – 2:03
"Surfers' Storm" (Witts) – 3:28
"The Crooked Man" (Knightley) – 4:52
"Captain's Court" (Lakeman) – 3:29
"Image Of Love" (Lakeman) – 3:38
"Track Of Words" (Knightley) – 3:20
"The Keeper" (Knightley) – 3:56
"Sand In Your Shoes" (Witts) – 3:25
"Ye Mariners All" (Trad. arr. Lakeman) – 3:15
"The Ballad Of Josie" (Lakeman) – 3:10
"If I Fall" (Knightley) – 4:10
"Dawn Wave" (Witts) – 3:40

Personnel
 Steve Knightley - Vocals, Guitar, Mandocello, Cuatro, Bass
 Seth Lakeman - Vocals, Tenor Guitar, Fiddle
 Jenna - Vocals, Keyboards
 Iain Goodall - Percussion

References

2004 albums
Seth Lakeman albums